Juliette Bessis (Arabic: جولييت بسيس) was born in 1925 in Gabès, Tunisia, and died 2017 in Paris, France. She was a contemporary Tunisian scholar and historian specializing in the Maghreb region of northern Africa.

Life 
Born Juliette Saada on 16 September 1925, she was part of a Tunisian Jewish upper middle-class family in the southern region of Tunisia, which at the time was under French colonial rule.

Early life 
At the age of 17, she became active in the Tunisian Communist Party, promoting anti-fascist struggles and resisting the German occupation of Tunisia from November 1942 to May 1943. During that time, she met Aldo Bessis (1918-1969) and they married on 3 February 1944, but she did not change her last name to Bessis until her first daughter Sophie Bessis was born.

After studying at the Lycée Armand Fallières (now known as Lycée de la Rue de Russie) in Tunis and Bessis studied at Ecole des Hautes Etudes de Tunis, which later became Tunis University (affiliated with the Sorbonne in Paris), and earned her bachelor's degree in the early 1950s. In 1956, she was appointed professor at the Khaznadar annex of Sadiki College. A specialist in contemporary Maghreb history, her research focused on fascist politics in the Mediterranean, Tunisian trade unionism and contemporary Libya. She earned her Ph.D. in contemporary history at the Sorbonne.

Bessis was a teacher at the Khaznadar high school until 1962.

After Tunisia 
In 1962, when the Tunisian civil service began purging its senior ranks of Jewish officials, the Bessis family left Tunisia, moving first to Cameroon where Aldo joined the United Nations agency for food and agriculture (FAO). There Juliette became a Unesco expert and was named professor of history in Yaoundé at the Ecole normale supérieure, which was part of the French university system. In 1964, the family moved to Addis Ababa, Ethiopia for a few months before Aldo Bessis was reassigned to FAO headquarters in Rome. Soon after that, the family relocated to Geneva where Aldo died in 1969. Juliette and her daughters finally moved to Paris in 1972.

Throughout her life, Bessis researched fascist politics in the Mediterranean and documented Mussolini's ambitions to reestablish, under his rule, the ancient Roman Empire. Her research formed the basis of her book titled La Méditerranée Fasciste (The Fascist Mediterranean) describing. Mussolini's Italy and its influence on Tunisia before and during the Second World War.

She subsequently taught in Paris at the Institute of Political Studies, often called Sciences Po, and at the University of Paris-VIII.

Death 
Juliette Bessis died on 18 March 2017 at the age of 91 in Paris.

In 2017, her daughter Sophie Bessis announced that she had donated her parents' library, a collection of books and newspapers on the history of Tunisia and the Maghreb, to the National Library of Tunis.

Selected publications 
 Bessis, Juliette. "Le Mouvement ouvrier tunisien: de ses origines à l'indépendance." Le mouvement social (1974): 85-108.
 Bessis, Juliette. "Chekib Arslan et les mouvements nationalistes au Maghreb." Revue historique 259.Fasc. 2 (526 (1978): 467-489.
Bessis, Juliette. La Méditerranée fasciste: l'Italie mussolinienne et la Tunisie. Vol. 15. Karthala Editions, 1981.
 Bessis, Juliette. "Sur Moncef Bey et le moncéfisme: La Tunisie de 1942 à 1948." Outre-Mers. Revue d'histoire 70.260 (1983): 97-131.
 Bessis, Juliette. Revue D'histoire Moderne Et Contemporaine (1954-), vol. 32, no. 4, 1985, pp. 697–699. JSTOR, www.jstor.org/stable/20529189. Accessed 7 Apr. 2021.
 Bessis, Juliette. "La politique américaine en Afrique du Nord pendant la seconde guerre mondiale." Revue des mondes musulmans et de la Méditerranée 36.1 (1983): 147-161.
 Bessis, Juliette. "Ebrei in un paese arabo: Gli ebrei nella Libia contemporanea tra colonialismo, nazionalismo arabo e sionismo (1935-1970)." (1985): 695-697.
 Bessis, Juliette. "L'Opposition France-etats-Unis au Maghreb de la Deuxième Guerre Mondiale jusqu'a l'indépendance des protectorats 1941–1956." Les Chemins de la Décolonisation de l'Empire coloniale français (1986): 341-56.

References 

1925 births
2017 deaths
Academic staff of Sciences Po
People from Gabès
Women historians
20th-century Tunisian historians
Historians of Africa
People from Tunis
Tunisian emigrants to France
Tunisian Jews
20th-century Tunisian women writers